The ceremonial county of Somerset consists of a non-metropolitan county, administered by Somerset County Council, which is divided into five districts, and two unitary authorities. The districts of Somerset are West Somerset, South Somerset, Taunton Deane, Mendip and Sedgemoor. The two administratively independent unitary authorities, which were established on 1 April 1996 following the breakup of the county of Avon, are North Somerset and Bath and North East Somerset.

National nature reserves in England (NNR) are designated under Part III of the National Parks and Access to the Countryside Act 1949 that are deemed to be of national importance by Natural England as key places for wildlife and natural features in England using section 35(1) of the Wildlife and Countryside Act 1981. They were established to protect the most significant areas of habitat and of geological formations. NNRs are managed on behalf of the nation, many by Natural England themselves, but also by non-governmental organisations, including Avon Wildlife Trust or the Somerset Wildlife Trust, the National Trust, and the Royal Society for the Protection of Birds.

There are 15 national nature reserves in the county. Several of the sites are associated with rivers and low-lying areas of the Somerset Levels. Ebbor Gorge is important for both biological and geological interest.

Sites

See also
National nature reserves in England
List of local nature reserves in Somerset
List of Sites of Special Scientific Interest in Somerset

Notes

References

 Somerset
Nature reserves in Somerset